Tun Mustapha Tower is a 122-metre, 30-story glass tower in Kota Kinabalu, Sabah, Malaysia. It was built in 1976 by Mori Building Company, a Japanese builder. The building was formerly named Yayasan Sabah Tower as it housed Sabah Foundation (Yayasan Sabah), a state-sponsored foundation to promote education and economic development in the state. In 2001, the tower was renamed to honour Tun Datu Mustapha, a former Sabah chief minister.

It is the fifth tallest building in Borneo after the 132-metre tall Sabah State Administrative Centre, 129-metre tall Jesselton Quay Citypads, 126-metre tall Wisma Sanyan and the 125-metre tall Harrington Suites.

There is a revolving floor on the 18th floor, which slowly spins to give a complete view of Likas Harbour. It makes one 360 degree rotation per hour.

In 1997, urban climber Alain Robert successfully scaled the building, with government approval, for a fundraiser.

See also
 List of tallest buildings in Kota Kinabalu
 Sabah State Legislative Assembly Building
 Wisma Innoprise
 Kinabalu Tower
 Jesselton Twin Towers

Buildings and structures in Kota Kinabalu
Tourist attractions in Sabah
Skyscrapers in Malaysia
Buildings and structures completed in 1977
20th-century architecture in Malaysia